The  2014 DBL All-Star Gala was an all-star game event organised by the Dutch Basketball League (DBL). It consisted of the best players of the 2013–14 DBL season. The event was held on 23 February 2014 in the KingsDome in Den Helder.

All-Star Game

The Dutch players won the game, Jeroen van der List was voted the All-Star Game MVP.

U23 All*Star Game

1 Williams didn't play because he was also selected for the All-Star Game.
Team North won the contest, Quincy Treffers was voted the MVP.

Three point contest
The top 8 shooters in the 2013–14 DBL season were selected.
 Arvin Slagter (GasTerra Flames) with 49,4%
 Raymond Cowels III (Den Helder Kings with 47,5%
 Kees Akerboom, Jr. (SPM Shoeters Den Bosch) with 47,3%
 Thijs Vermeulen (Matrixx Magixx) with 42,9%
 Justin Stommes (Landstede Basketbal) with 42,3%
 David Gonzalvez (SPM Shoeters Den Bosch) with 41,3%
 Sean Cunningham (Zorg en Zekerheid Leiden) with 40,2%
 Tjoe de Paula (Aris Leeuwarden) with 39,3%
Arvin Slagter won the contest.

Dunk contest
Van der List won the Dunk contest by beating Kelvin Martin and Ross Bekkering in the Final.

References

All